The Rodovia Perito Criminal Engenheiro Antonio Carlos Moraes (SP-041) is a state highway in the state of São Paulo in Brazil. 

Highways in São Paulo (state)